Poul Abraham Lehn (9 October 1732 – 24 October 1804), Baron of Lehn and Baron of Guldborgland, was a feudal baron of the Danish and Norwegian nobility and one of the greatest landowners of his time in Denmark.

Biography
His father was Abraham Lehn (1701–1757), an estate owner and collector of books and art. 
In 1731, Abraham Lehn and his brother Johan Lehn  (1705-1760) were ennobled; this made Poul Abraham Lehn noble as well when he was born in 1732. 
After the death of his father in 1757, he inherited the estates Berritzgaard and Højbygård on Lolland.
At the death of an uncle Johan Lehn in 1760, he received the Fyn estates Hvidkilde, Nielstrup and Lindskov.

Poul Abraham Lehn created the Barony of Guldborgland from his holdings at Berritzgaard and the purchase of Orebygaard  in 1775, combining all of his possessions northwest of Sakskøbing. 
In 1784, Baron Poul Abraham Lehn acquired Lungholm. In 1803, Højbygaard and Lungholm were converted into an entailed estate (stamhus) under the name Baroniet Sønderkarle for his daughter, Johanne Frederikke Lehn, whose husband was Frederik Wallmoden of Fuglsang Manor.  The legal effect of a stamhus was that the estate could neither be sold, mortgaged or divided between heirs.

In 1780 and 1784, based on his family estates, Lehn was made feudal baron of the Barony of Lehn and of the Barony of Guldborgland, respectively.

Personal life
On 22 May 1761, he married Erica Christine de Cicignon (1744–1796), daughter of Johan Frederik de Cicignon (1701–1765). They had the following children:
 Johan Lehn (1763–1766)
 Sophie Amalie Lehn, Baroness of Lehn and of Guldborgland (1764–1834), ∞ Hans Rantzau (1764–1808), who adopted the name Rantzau-Lehn and inherited the baronies; issue
 Margrethe Krabbe Lehn, Baroness of Lehn and of Guldborgland (1766–1789), ∞ Hartvig Gottfried von Barner (1763–1811); issue
 Erica Christine Lehn, Baroness of Lehn and of Guldborgland (1771–1804)
 Elisabeth Catharina Lehn, Baroness of Lehn and of Guldborgland (1772–1802), ∞ (1) Caspar Hermann von Krogh of Søholt; no issue; (2) Frederik Julian Christian von Bertouch (1764–1831); issue, who adopted the name Bertouch-Lehn and was made Baron of Sønderkarle
 Johanne Frederikke Lehn, Baroness of Lehn and of Guldborgland (1775–1805) ∞  Frederik Wallmoden of Fuglsang Manor.

References

Further reading
 Holm, Edvard: Poul Abraham Lehn in Bricka, C.F. (ed.): Dansk Biografisk Lexikon Copenhagen: Gyldendal 1887–1905.

External links
 Poul Abraham Lehn at geni.com

18th-century Danish nobility
1732 births
1804 deaths
Place of birth missing
18th-century Norwegian nobility
18th-century Danish landowners